Darnell King (born September 23, 1990) is an American soccer player who currently plays for Phoenix Rising FC in the USL Championship.

Career
King played in forward for Tampa's Gaither High School, setting a school record with 71 points in a season. In 2008, his senior year, King was named to the All-Hillsborough County team.

From 2008 to 2011, King played as a forward for the Florida Atlantic Owls. King was the Owls' leading scorer during his sophomore, junior, and senior seasons.

King participated in the 2012 NASL Combine where he was noticed by Fort Lauderdale Strikers' coaching staff. He was invited to preseason with the Strikers, where he impressed enough to earn his first professional contract. On March 27, 2012 the Strikers announced that King had signed professional terms with the club.

King made his professional debut with the Strikers as a second half sub against FC Edmonton on April 7, 2012 in the first game of the 2012 NASL season. He played 15 minutes after replacing Leopoldo Morales in the 75th minute. On July 2, King started and played 90 minutes in an unfamiliar right back position, and took the throw-in that lead to the opening goal. He started at right back in the Strikers' next match against the Carolina RailHawks, and scored his first goal as a professional in the 31st minute of the 3–3 draw. King ended up primarily playing right back for the Strikers and was named to the 2014 NASL Best XI as a defender.

On December 22, 2014, King returned to Tampa Bay by signing with the NASL's Tampa Bay Rowdies

On February 6, 2018, King made the move to United Soccer League side San Antonio FC. King earned a spot on the All-League team at the end of 2018.

King signed with Nashville SC on December 4, 2018, rejoining former Rowdies teammate Matt Pickens. He then signed with Phoenix Rising FC on December 18, 2019.

Career statistics

Statistics accurate as of December 4, 2018

References

External links
Tampa Bay Rowdies bio

1990 births
Living people
American soccer players
Florida Atlantic Owls men's soccer players
Floridians FC players
Fort Lauderdale Strikers players
Tampa Bay Rowdies players
San Antonio FC players
Nashville SC (2018–19) players
Phoenix Rising FC players
Soccer players from Tampa, Florida
USL League Two players
North American Soccer League players
USL Championship players
Association football wingers
Association football fullbacks